The Grace (stylized as  天上智喜 The Grace; abbreviated as CSJH, CSJH The Grace) is a South Korean a cappella girl group formed by SM Entertainment in 2005, with four members: Lina, Dana, Sunday and Stephanie. They are known as Tenjochiki (天上智喜, Tenjōchiki) in Japanese releases, and are sometimes referred to as CSJH The Grace, an acronym from their korean name Cheon Sang Ji Hui The Grace (Korean: 천상지희 더 그레이스).

They debuted with the single Too Good on April 29, 2005. Throughout the group's career, they released and performed music in Korean and Japanese with a total of three studio albums and many more singles.

The group continued to release music until their second Japanese album Dear..., in January 2009. After Stephanie's injury in 2010, the group's activities were to be halted. In July 2011, the group returned with the duo unit Dana & Sunday, with the duo continuing to release some digital singles before also going into hiatus. All of The Grace's members currently maintain solo careers in fields including music, theater, and television, while member Stephanie signed with another music label for her solo music and maintaining her contract with SM Entertainment until it expired in 2016. Dana left SM Entertainment after contract expired on June 23, 2020. On January 19, 2021, Sunday left SM Entertainment.

History

2005: Debut with "Too Good" and "Boomerang"
The Grace made their first live performance in China on April 29, 2005. They performed their debut songs "Too Good" and "Boomerang", and the performance was broadcast weeks later by the Chinese channel CCTV. The verses in "Boomerang" were also sung in Chinese. The quartet made their first live performance in South Korea with "Too Good" on SBS's music program Inkigayo on May 1, 2005. They promoted the song for a few months before switching to "Boomerang".

After 7 months of promoting their first singles in Korea, the group headed off to promote in China. The Chinese version of the single was officially released in March 2006. The single included three new tracks: the Chinese versions of "Too Good" and "Boomerang" and the pre-group track "Fight To The End". After promotional activities concluded, The Grace headed to Japan.

2006: Japanese debut and "My Everything"
They debut Japanese single "Boomerang" was released January 25, 2006. Later, the song was re-recorded and released with Japanese lyrics and an altered instrumental track, and a B-side called Do You Know?, a solo song by member Sunday. "Boomerang" ranked #110 in the Japanese Singles Top 200 chart.

On March 8, they released second Japanese single "The Club", along with a solo song by Stephanie called "What U Want" was released. It reached #131 on the Japanese Oricon Charts. The single was also promoted briefly in South Korea. After quick promotional activities in Korea, the group went back to Japan for their third Japanese single, "Sweet Flower" which was used as the theme for the month of April on the TBS Radio & Communications music show Count Down TV.  "Sweet Flower" entered the charts at #151. The single was also released in Korea by SM, but it was left unchanged from its Japanese version.

The Chinese version of their Japanese single "Boomerang" was released on June 19 by Avex Trax's official Chinese distributor CRSC in China. In Taiwan and Hong Kong, also included the Korean version of The Club was released and contained a Chinese version of "The Club" plus a DVD with the Korean music video.

Even with the first few singles having low sales, another single was scheduled to be released. "Juicy Love" was in stark contrast with The Grace's previous singles, as it had a reggae beat. Corn Head, a Japanese reggae singer, was featured in this song. The B-side was "Sayonara no Mukō ni", The Grace's first Japanese ballad written and sung by Dana. Like the previous single, "Juicy Love" was released in Korea unchanged.

After returning to Korea on November 3, 2006, the band released the single "My Everything" and started promotion as CSJH The Grace. The song is a ballad track unlike their previous singles. The B-side track included an A cappella version of George Michael's "Faith", "The Final Sentence" and "Iris". However, the change did not result in an increase in sales; the single entered at #30 on the Music Industry Association of Korea's month-end sales chart.

2007: One More Time, OK? and Graceful4
The group's first album, 한번 더, OK? (Hanbeon Deo, OK?; One More Time, OK?) was released on May 4, 2007. The title song "One More Time, OK?" was The Grace's most successful song to date, topping Mnet M! Countdown and SBS Inkigayo charts. The album reached sixth place for the month. On June 15, the album was released in Taiwan, The Grace's first major release overseas. "One More Time, OK?" won the Best Dance Music award at the 2007 Mnet Asian Music Awards (M.Net KM Music Festival).

A fifth Japanese single by the group, "Piranha" was released in August, consisting of "Piranha" and Japanese versions of "My Everything" and "Just For One Day", featuring TVXQ's Jaejoong. The single debuted at #26 on the Oricon daily charts and peaked at #50 on weekly charts.

In November, their first Japanese album Graceful 4 was released, consisting of nine previously released songs and new material, including the Japanese version of "One More Time, OK?" from their first Korean album's title track.

2008: "Stand Up People" and "Here"
During the first months of 2008, The Grace performed at various events in support of their first Japanese album. They held three concerts in April and May named Graceful Party Vol. 1. The last one, at Daikanyama UNIT in Tokyo, featured their upcoming release "Here", a collaboration with hip-hop group, Cliff Edge.

Their sixth Japanese single called "Stand Up People", was released on July 23. It consisted of "Dear Friend", remixes of "Stand Up People" and "One More Time, OK?". Their seventh single, "Here" was released on October 22, but after the song leaked, a limited-time free download was offered. "Here" was the theme song of both the drama and movie of Homeless School Student, based on a Japanese best-seller book. A second song and music video were released, titled "Near". "Here" reached #16 on the Oricon Charts with sales of over 16,000.

2009–11: Dear..., sub-unit,  Indefinite Hiatus and departure from SM 
The group's second Japanese album Dear... was released on January 7, 2009. The album peaked #14 on Oricon daily album charts and #37 on the Oricon weekly album charts, charted for 3 weeks and sold 4,734 copies, making it their most successful Japanese album.

The Grace appeared on the soundtrack of the Japanese movie Subaru with the songs "Sukoshi De Ii Kara / A Bit of Good" and "Coming To You". "Sukoshi De Ii Kara / A Bit of Good" was part of The Grace's second Japanese Album 'Dear.... Stephanie also appeared in the movie as a ballet trainer.

In March 2009, It was announced through the group's Japanese website that Stephanie absent from the group activities due to back pain injury and the group would continue as a three-member group.

On May 21, 2010,  The Grace continued as a trio performing "My Everything" and "One More Time, OK?" at the SM Town Live' 10 World Tour in Seoul.

In 2011, Dana and Sunday formed The Grace - Dana & Sunday, the first sub-unit of the group. Since then, the group has been on an indefinite hiatus, with its members focusing exclusively on their solo activities. There are no plans for further promotions with SM.

On May 15, 2016, SM Entertainment announced Stephanie would be departing from the group after a prolonged hiatus, due to the expiration of her contract. She subsequently chose to sign as a soloist with Mafia Records. On June 23, 2020, Dana also announced that, after 19 years with SM Entertainment, she would leave On January 19, 2021, Sunday left SM Entertainment upon the expiration of her contract after 16 years. The group has been on an indefinite hiatus since 2010. However, all of the members except Lina left SM entertainment and no indication of the members promoting as a group again has led to the unofficial disbandment of the group.

Sub-units

Dana & Sunday
On July 4, 2011, SM announced the return of The Grace after a four year hiatus with the unit were composed of Dana and Sunday. Their debut single, "One More Chance (나 좀 봐줘)" music video was released on July 8, following their debut stage on KBS Music Bank in the same day. Their debut single officially released on July 11.

On September 23, Dana & Sunday featured on part four of the soundtrack for the drama Hooray for Love (애정만만세) with the track "Now You" (지금 그대). Dana and Sunday's "With Coffee Project Part 1" was released on December 20 together with the music video of the song.

The duo also participated in the eighth SM Town winter compilation album, 2011 Winter SMTown – The Warmest Gift. The two performed the song "Amazing", which was released as a physical album only on December 13, 2011.

Though performing as solo artists, Dana and Sunday performed at SM Town Live 2019 concert in Tokyo on August 3–5, 2019.

Discography

Studio albums

Singles

Other appearances

DVDs
Rhythm Nation 2006: The biggest indoor music festival (Released: July 11, 2007) (Japan)
 Track 7: Boomerang A-Nation'07: Best Hit Live (Released: November 7, 2007) (Japan)
 Track 4: Piranha Rhythm Nation 2007: The biggest indoor music festival (Released: April 2, 2008) (Japan)
 Track 15: One More Time, OK? A-Nation'08: Avex All Cast Special Live (Released: November 26, 2008) (Japan)
 Track 29: Stand Up People'''

Music videos

Concerts

 Headlining 
 Graceful Party Vol. 1 (2008)
 Tenjochiki 1st Live Tour 2009 ~Dear...~

 Concert participation 
 2007 SM Town Summer Concert (2007)
 SM Town Live '08 (2008)
 SM Town Live '10 World Tour (2010)
 SM Town Live World Tour III (2012)
 SM Town Live 2019 in Tokyo (2019) (as separate performers)''

Awards

References

Notes

External links
 Official Korean Website (2007 archive) 
 Official Korean Website (CSJH – Dana and Sunday) (2020 archive) 
 Official Japanese Website (2011 archive) 

2005 establishments in South Korea
SM Town
SM Entertainment artists
Avex Group artists
South Korean girl groups
South Korean dance music groups
South Korean expatriates in Japan
Japanese-language singers of South Korea
Mandarin-language singers of South Korea
K-pop music groups
Musical quartets
Musical groups established in 2005
Musical groups from Seoul
MAMA Award winners
South Korean musical trios